Russkaya Gvozdyovka is a rural locality (a selo) and the administrative center of Russko-Gvozdyovskoye Rural Settlement, Ramonsky District, Voronezh Oblast, Russia. The population was 892 as of 2010. There are 16 streets.

Geography 
Russkaya Gvozdyovka is located on the right bank of the Don River, 30 km southwest of Ramon (the district's administrative centre) by road. Gvozdyovka is the nearest rural locality.

References 

Rural localities in Ramonsky District